The year 1973 in architecture involved some significant architectural events and new buildings.

Buildings and structures

Buildings opened

 February 14 – Vicksburg Bridge over the Mississippi River, United States.
 April 4 – The World Trade Center in New York City, designed by Minoru Yamasaki.
 May 10 – General Belgrano Bridge, over the Paraná River, Argentina.
 June 29 – Clifton Cathedral (Roman Catholic) in Bristol, England, designed by R. J. Weeks with F. S. Jennett and A. Poremba of the Percy Thomas Partnership.
 July 19 – National Stadium, Singapore.
 August 25 – Jesús Soto Museum of Modern Art in Ciudad Bolívar, Venezuela, designed by Carlos Raúl Villanueva.
 September – Kenyatta International Conference Centre in Nairobi, Kenya, designed by Karl Henrik Nøstvik.
 October 20 – Sydney Opera House in Sydney, Australia, designed by Jørn Utzon.
 October 30 – Bosphorus Bridge in Istanbul, Turkey.
 The Aon Center in Chicago, Illinois, United States, originally known as the Standard Oil Building.
 Sears Tower in Chicago, Illinois, United States, designed by Skidmore, Owings & Merrill, becomes the tallest building in the world.
 Uris Hall at Cornell University, designed by Gordon Bunshaft of Skidmore, Owings & Merrill
 Theatr Ardudwy at Coleg Harlech in Wales, designed by Colwyn Foulkes & Partners.

Buildings completed

 May – Sears Tower, Chicago, designed by Skidmore, Owings & Merrill.
 September 4 – First Wisconsin Center in Milwaukee, Wisconsin.
 date unknown
 Alpha Tower, Birmingham, England, designed by George Marsh of Richard Seifert & Partners.
 The Carlton Centre in Johannesburg, South Africa, becomes the tallest building in South Africa and in Africa (1973–present).
 Großgaststätte Ahornblatt, Berlin, Germany (demolished in 2000).
 Harvard Science Center at Harvard University, Boston, Massachusetts, designed by Josep Lluís Sert.
 IDS Center in Minneapolis, Minnesota.
 Boyana Residence, Sofia (later National Historical Museum (Bulgaria)), designed by Alexander Barov.
 Underhill (underground residence), Holme, West Yorkshire, England, designed by Arthur Quarmby.
 29 Lansdowne Crescent, London (infill residence), designed by Jeremy Lever.
 Kyiv TV Tower in Kyiv, Ukraine.
 Mala Rijeka Viaduct, Podgorica, Montenegro.
 Royal Centre (Vancouver) in Vancouver, British Columbia, Canada
 Empire Landmark Hotel in Vancouver
 Granville Square in Vancouver
 Tour Montparnasse in Paris, France, designed by Eugène Beaudouin, Urbain Cassan and Louis Hoym de Marien.
 Tower 2 of the Meritus Mandarin Singapore in Singapore.
 Cromwell Tower in London, England.
 Le Pyramide market in Abidjan, Ivory Coast, designed by Rinaldo Olivieri.
 Zagreb TV Tower in Zagreb, Croatia..

Events
 Vladimir Somov designs the Fyodor Dostoyevsky Theater of Dramatic Art for Veliky Novgorod.

Awards
 American Academy of Arts and Letters Gold Medal – Louis Kahn
 Alvar Aalto Medal – Hakon Ahlberg
 Architecture Firm Award – Shepley Bulfinch Richardson and Abbott
 Prix de l'Académie d'Architecture de France – Kenzo Tange
 RAIA Gold Medal – Jørn Utzon
 RIBA Royal Gold Medal – Leslie Martin
 AIA Twenty-five Year Award – Taliesin West

Births
 January 24 – Eero Endjärv, Estonian architect
 date unknown – Zahava Elenberg, Australian architect

Deaths
 January 22 – Stanisław Staszewski, Polish architect and poet (born 1925)
 June 14 – Clifford Percy Evans, American architect (born 1889)
 June 27 – Odd Nansen, Norwegian architect, author, and humanitarian (born 1901)
 September 20 – Leslie Wilkinson, Australian architect (born 1882)
 December 8 – Paul Bartholomew, American architect (born 1883)

References

 
20th-century architecture